USS LST-463 was a United States Navy  used in the Asiatic-Pacific Theater during World War II. As with many of her class, the ship was never named. Instead, she was referred to by her hull designation.

Construction
The ship was laid down on 6 October 1942, under Maritime Commission (MARCOM) contract, MC hull 983, by  Kaiser Shipyards, Vancouver, Washington; launched 9 November 1942; and commissioned on 23 February 1943.

Service history
During World War II, LST-463 was assigned to the Asiatic-Pacific theater. She took part in the Bismarck Archipelago operation, the Cape Gloucester, New Britain, landings from December 1943 through March 1944; the Eastern New Guinea operation, the Saidor occupation in January and February 1944; Hollandia operation in April 1944; the Western New Guinea operations, the Biak Islands operation in May and June 1944, the Noemfoor Island operation in July 1944, the Cape Sansapor operation in July and August 1944, and the Morotai landing in September 1944; the Leyte operation in October and November 1944; the Lingayen Gulf landings in January 1945; the Zambales-Subic Bay operation in January 1945, the Mindanao Island landings in April 1945, and the assault and occupation of Okinawa Gunto in June 1945.

Following the war, LST-463 returned to the United States and was decommissioned on 6 June 1946, and struck from the Navy list on 19 June, that same year. On 3 November 1947, the tank landing ship was sold to Dulien Steel Products, Inc., of Seattle, Washington.

Honors and awards
LST-463 earned nine battle stars for her World War II service.

Notes 

Citations

Bibliography 

Online resources

External links

 

1942 ships
World War II amphibious warfare vessels of the United States
LST-1-class tank landing ships of the United States Navy
S3-M2-K2 ships
Ships built in Vancouver, Washington